Canelo Álvarez vs. Matthew Hatton was a 154-pound world title fight, that aired on HBO's Boxing After Dark. Rising Mexican star Canelo Álvarez fought, and defeated former junior lightweight champion Ricky Hatton's younger brother Matthew Hatton in his first time headlining a big undercard in the United States. It was the first time for either fighter to challenge for a major belt in any division.

The fight
Alvarez dominated nearly every minute and unanimously outpointed Matthew Hatton on Saturday night to win the vacant WBC 154-pound belt, adding another superlative to a top boxing prospect's remarkable rise.

Alvarez (36-0-1, 26 KOs) picked apart Hatton from the opening bell, peppering the smaller Englishman with head shots and using his brute power. Hatton (41-5-2) twice went to the canvas after getting hit out of a break with Alvarez, but wasn't seriously hurt either time.

All three judges scored the bout 119-108, meaning Alvarez won every round on every card. He lost one point for an illegal punch in the seventh round, which was uniformly scored 9-9.

Alvarez landed 47 percent of his 626 punches, including 53 percent of his power shots, while Hatton connected with just 25 percent of his 546 total blows.

Undercard

Televised
Super Welterweight Championship bout: Canelo Álvarez vs.  Matthew Hatton
Alvarez defeats Hatton by unanimous decision.
Super Featherweight bout: Daniel Ponce de Leon vs.  Adrien Broner
Broner defeats de Leon by unanimous decision.

Untelevised
Heavyweight bout: Seth Mitchell vs.  Charles Davis
 Mitchell defeats Davis by TKO at 1:02 of round 2.
Super Middleweight bout: James Kirkland vs.  Ahsandi Gibbs
Kirkland defeats Kliewer by KO at 0:34 of round 1.
Super Middleweight bout: Daniel Jacobs vs.  Robert Kliewer
 Jacobs defeats Kliewer by TKO at 1:44 of round 1.
Middleweight bout: Jason Montgomery vs.  Cleven Ishe
Ishe defeats Montgomery by unanimous decision.
Middleweight bout: Alfonso Blanco vs.  Pablo Ruiz
Blanco defeats Ruiz by KO at 2:59 of round 1.

Reported fight earnings
These are the payouts to some of the fighters. These are the California State Athletic Commission purses as per the California bout agreements. They does not include sponsor money or other common forms of revenue paid through other streams. In California, if a fighter is more than two pounds overweight he is automatically penalized 20 percent of his purse and the weigh-in is over.

Canelo Álvarez $350,000 vs. Matthew Hatton$150,000
The fine will stand against Canelo Álvarez, who weighed in at 151.8 pounds and will forfeit $70,000 of his $350,000 purse. The Hatton camp asked Alvarez to try to lose the weight, which he agreed to do after a spirited discussion. When he came back to the scale about an hour later, he failed to make the limit of 150, weighing in at 151.4 on the scale.

References

External links
HBO

Hatton
2011 in boxing
Boxing in California
Sports competitions in Anaheim, California
2011 in sports in California
Boxing on HBO
Golden Boy Promotions
March 2011 sports events in the United States